A/S Bynesruten was a bus company that operated in Trondheim, Norway. From 1924 to 1972, it operated a 30-kilometer bus route from Trondheim to Byneset and Spongdal.

The company was founded in 1924 as a cooperative, A/L Bynesruten. It became a limited company in 1948. By 1964, the city council had bought 93 of 161 shares, after Trondheim Bilruter had failed to purchase it. On 1 January 1972, Bynesruten merged with the city's two municipal-owned tramway companies, Trondheim Sporvei and Graakalbanen, to create Trondheim Trafikkselskap. At the time of the merger, Bynesruten had 17 buses, 11 trucks and 40 drivers.

References

Bus companies of Trøndelag
Companies based in Trondheim
Transport companies established in 1924
Transport companies disestablished in 1972
1924 establishments in Norway
1972 disestablishments in Norway